Julius Crosslin (born November 1, 1983) is a former American football fullback. He was signed by the Dallas Cowboys as an undrafted free agent in 2008. He played college football at Oklahoma State.

External links
Dallas Cowboys bio
Oklahoma State Cowboys bio

1983 births
Living people
Sportspeople from Amarillo, Texas
American football fullbacks
Oklahoma State Cowboys football players
Dallas Cowboys players
Players of American football from Texas